Subramanian Raja Krishnamoorthi (born July 19, 1973) is an American businessman, politician, and attorney serving as the U.S. representative for  since 2017. The district includes many of Chicago's western and northwestern suburbs, such as Hoffman Estates, Elgin, Schaumburg, Wood Dale, and Elk Grove Village. He was elected to succeed Tammy Duckworth, who gave up the seat to run for the U.S. Senate. A member of the Democratic Party, Krishnamoorthi serves on the House Select Committee on Strategic Competition between the United States and the Chinese Communist Party, the House Committee on Oversight and Accountability, and the House Permanent Select Committee on Intelligence. He also serves as an assistant whip.

Early life and education
Krishnamoorthi was born in 1973 into a Tamil-speaking family in New Delhi, India. His family moved to Buffalo, New York, when he was three months old so that his father could attend graduate school. Though some early economic hardships necessitated living in public housing and using food assistance for a time, in 1980, the Krishnamoorthis moved to Peoria, Illinois, where his father became a professor at Bradley University and they enjoyed a middle-class upbringing. Krishnamoorthi attended public schools in Peoria and was a valedictorian of his graduating class at Richwoods High School.

Krishnamoorthi attended Princeton University, where he earned a bachelor's degree in mechanical engineering summa cum laude. He then received a Juris Doctor with honors from Harvard Law School. During law school, Krishnamoorthi was managing editor of the Harvard Civil Rights and Civil Liberties Law Review, and published a law review article on the implementation of Local School Councils in Chicago public elementary schools.

Early career

After graduating from Harvard, Krishnamoorthi served as a law clerk for Joan B. Gottschall and worked on Barack Obama's 2000 election campaign for the United States House of Representatives. He also served as an issues director for Obama's 2004 campaign for the United States Senate, and aided in the development of Obama's 2004 Democratic National Convention keynote address.
  
After being appointed to the Board of the Illinois Housing Development Authority, Krishnamoorthi practiced law and then served as a special assistant attorney general, helping start the state's anti-corruption unit under Illinois Attorney General Lisa Madigan. He served as deputy state treasurer for Illinois Treasurer Alexi Giannoulias from 2007 to 2009 and then as vice-chairman of the Illinois Innovation Council. He was the president of high-tech small businesses in the Chicago area until he resigned before entering Congress to eliminate any conflicts of interest.

U.S. House of Representatives

Elections 
In 2010, Krishnamoorthi ran for the Democratic Party nomination for Illinois Comptroller. He lost the primary election to David E. Miller by less than 1% of the vote.

When Duckworth ran for the U.S. Senate in 2016, Krishnamoorthi again declared his candidacy for the U.S. House of Representatives. He won the March 2016 primary election with 57% of the vote, to Michael Noland's 29% and Deb Bullwinkel's 13%. Krishnamoorthi defeated Republican Pete DiCianni in the November general election, capturing 58.1% of the vote after a campaign in which he vowed to fight for middle-class families in Congress.

Krishnamoorthi was unopposed for the 2018 Democratic nomination, and won the general election with more than 66% of the vote.

Krishnamoorthi received 80% of the vote in the 2020 Democratic primary, and defeated Libertarian candidate Preston Nelson in the general election, 73% to 26%.

Krishnamoorthi won the 2022 Democratic nomination with 71% of the vote. During the general election, he was named to the National Republican Congressional Committee's "Top Target" list. Krishnamoorthi was reelected to a fourth term, defeating the Republican nominee by a 14-point margin.

Tenure 
Krishnamoorthi was sworn into office on January 3, 2017.

While Krishnamoorthi attended President Donald Trump's January 2017 inauguration, he said he did so in part "because I want President Trump to look at the crowd and Congress and see on day one that he will be strongly opposed if he continues to pursue policies that hurt working families." The day before the inauguration, Krishnamoorthi was included in a list featured in The Guardian of "up-and-coming leaders of the Trump resistance in Washington."

Law enforcement funding 
In May 2022, Krishnamoorthi joined Hoffman Estates Mayor McLeod, WINGS President and CEO Rebecca Darr, and Chief of Police Kathryn Cawley in a ceremony recognizing the Village's formal acceptance of a $150,000 Edward Byrne Justice Assistance Grant Krishnamoorthi secured for the Hoffman Estates Domestic Violence Project. This funding furthers local organizations' ability to provide social services to the community related to combating domestic violence through expanding specialized police training, funds for a domestic violence counselor, and building an emergency fund to assist survivors of domestic violence.

In June 2022, Krishnamoorthi joined local officials to present the Schaumburg Police Department with a check for $340,000 in recognition of federal funding he secured for a mobile response unit for mental health and substance misuse. This unit, implemented by the Schaumburg Police Department, Elk Grove Police Department, the Start Here Addiction Rehabilitation and Education Program, the Foglia Treatment Center, the Kenneth Young Center, and Live4Lali, allows the police to address 911 calls through crisis intervention overseen by social workers and community response professionals with experience related to mental health and substance disorders.

Education, job training and workforce development 
In June 2017, the House unanimously passed the Thompson-Krishnamoorthi Strengthening Career and Technical Education for the 21st Century Act, which would overhaul the Carl D. Perkins Career and Technical Education Act and provide more flexibility to states. In November 2017, Krishnamoorthi and GT Thompson co-led a letter to the Senate education committee with 235 fellow members of the House urging them to take up the legislation. The Strengthening Career and Technical Education for the 21st Century Act passed the Senate and was signed into law by President Trump in July 2018.

Health care 
During a January 2017 floor debate in the House of Representatives, Krishnamoorthi argued against repealing the Affordable Care Act. Citing his experience running small businesses, Krishnamoorthi said, "repealing without replacing the Affordable Care Act would devastate our economy and harm millions of middle-class families. Within the 8th district of Illinois, we could lose upwards of over $550 million from our economy and over 4,000 jobs. I know firsthand how important health coverage is to workers and to business. Without the protections of the Affordable Care Act, we will see fewer entrepreneurs take the risk of starting a business and fewer workers take the risk of working for a start-up."

Presidential pardons 
In July 2017, Krishnamoorthi introduced the Presidential Pardon Transparency Act, which would require that all presidential pardons be disclosed to the public within three days of being granted. The legislation followed reports that Trump was consulting senior aides and the White House counsel about his ability to pardon associates, family members, and himself. The bill did not receive a vote and was reintroduced in 2019.

Trump administration security clearance issues 
In October 2017, Krishnamoorthi questioned the director of the National Background Investigations Bureau about the number of mistakes made in Senior Presidential Advisor Jared Kushner's security clearance during a hearing by the House Committee on Oversight and Government Reform. In response to repeated questioning about whether he could recall "if there has ever been an applicant having to submit four addenda detailing over 100 errors and omissions being able to maintain their security clearance once those errors have been identified," Director Phalen said that he had never seen that level of mistakes.

Immigration and Trump administration's travel ban 
On January 28, 2017, Trump's executive order placing restrictions on people entering the U.S. from seven Muslim-majority countries caused 18 travelers arriving at O'Hare International Airport to be detained and questioned by federal officers, including a family of legal permanent residents and their 18-month-old baby, who held U.S. citizenship. Krishnamoorthi arrived at O'Hare within hours to speak to immigration officials but was told they were unavailable. While joining a protest at the airport Krishnamoorthi said of the detentions, "They applied legally, they've been vetted and they've been here, in many cases, for decades, and they were detained by their own country at the airport. So many of our businesses rely on green card holders. How are we supposed to attract these people if they think they'll be detained at the airport if they go abroad for a wedding, or just to show their baby to relatives?"

In a WGN radio interview the next morning, Krishnamoorthi denounced Trump's immigration initiative, calling it the "worst executive order you could draw up to unify the country."

On November 16, Krishnamoorthi co-led a letter to the Department of Homeland Security, alongside Democratic Caucus Chairman Joe Crowley, Luis Gutierrez of Illinois, Adriano Espaillat of New York, and 60 Democratic cosigners, about the postal services delays that caused hundreds of DACA renewal applications to arrive after the October 5 deadline. The department later reversed its position and announced that it would allow those affected to resend their applications.

National security 
Krishnamoorthi authored the KREMLIN Act, which passed the House with bipartisan support in March 2019. The bill would require the Director of National Intelligence to provide intelligence assessments to Congress about the posture and intentions of the Russian Federation and its leaders toward NATO and NATO members.

Krishnamoorthi also authored the Seeding Enterprises in the Microelectronics Industry (SEMI) Act and the Geospatial Partnership for Security (GPS) Act. The SEMI Act would allocate $15 million for research and development of new microelectronics and computing technologies through the Intelligence Advanced Research Projects Activity (IARPA). The GPS Act would provide additional funding to the National Geospatial-Intelligence Agency (NGA) for the purposes of improving access and cooperation between the NGA and commercial geospatial intelligence data and services.

First impeachment of Donald Trump 
As a member of both the House Oversight Committee and the House Permanent Select Committee on Intelligence, Krishnamoorthi was closely involved in Trump's impeachment. The Oversight and Intelligence Committees were both tasked with investigating the accusations against Trump, and as a member of the Intelligence Committee, Krishnamoorthi also took part in televised public hearings, questioning various witnesses brought before the committee.

Storming of the U.S. Capitol and the second impeachment of Donald Trump 
After Trump supporters stormed the U.S. Capitol on January 6, 2021, Krishnamoorthi advocated Trump's removal through either impeachment or the 25th amendment. In the ensuing second impeachment of Trump, he voted to impeach after saying on the House floor, "My parents brought me as an infant to America because they knew it's the land of democracy. It's the beacon of hope for all the world; we called it the American Dream. When Donald Trump told rioters to go to the capitol and 'fight like hell,' he incited an attack on the capitol and the ideals comprising the American dream. I'm voting for impeachment because I know we're still the country my parents believed in, and I will fight like hell for it."

Vaping and e-cigarettes 
Time magazine called Krishnamoorthi the vaping industry's "biggest enemy in D.C." In July 2019, as chairman of the House Oversight Subcommittee on Economic and Consumer Policy, he held hearings investigating the industry's marketing practices, especially those allegedly aimed at children. In the wake of this investigation, the FDA issued a warning letter to e-cigarette manufacturer Juul Labs, which then halted all domestic marketing and advertising. Krishnamoorthi has also authored or co-sponsored several pieces of legislation aimed at curbing e-cigarette use, including the Protecting American Lungs and Reversing the Youth Tobacco Epidemic Act of 2020, which passed the House in February 2020. He also successfully advocated increased funding for youth e-cigarette prevention programs in the combined omnibus spending bill and COVID-19 relief package that was signed into law on December 27, 2020.

COVID-19 pandemic 
During the COVID-19 pandemic of 2020, Krishnamoorthi co-sponsored the $2.2 trillion CARES Act, the first stimulus package, signed into law in March. He also voted for the HEROES Act, House Democrats' initial attempt at a second stimulus bill, which passed the House in May but never came up for a vote in the Senate. Additionally, Krishnamoorthi authored or co-sponsored several other pieces of legislation to address the pandemic's health and economic impact, including the Coronavirus Health Care Worker Wellness Act and the Paycheck Protection Program Flexibility Act, which was signed into law in June. After passing the second stimulus package in December 2020, Krishnamoorthi also voted in favor of increasing the direct stimulus payments from $600 to $2000.

As chair of the House Oversight Subcommittee on Consumer and Economic Policy, Krishnamoorthi led several investigations into the federal response to the pandemic, including the federal ventilator shortage and the Trump administration's misuse of CDC funds for partisan political messaging, funds that were originally intended for a public awareness campaign. After public outcry, the Department of Health and Human Services canceled the campaign using celebrities who had been vetted, in part, based on their political leanings. Krishnamoorthi also led an investigation into the FDA's failure to properly regulate serological antibody tests during the pandemic's early phase. In the spring and early summer, the FDA allowed manufacturers to "self-validate" serological test kits, and a House Oversight Subcommittee on Consumer and Economic Policy investigation Krishnamoorthi led found that the FDA "was not reviewing antibody test kits that went on the market ... and had failed even to ask for information that would have allowed FDA to conduct a cursory review of the tests' effectiveness." After this investigation, the FDA changed its policy, requiring manufacturers of serological antibody tests to seek Emergency Use Authorization (EUA) within 10 days.

In 2021, Krishnamoorthi was also appointed to the Select Subcommittee on the Coronavirus Crisis.

Armenia–Azerbaijan conflict
In October 2020, Krishnamoorthi co-signed a letter to Secretary of State Mike Pompeo condemning Azerbaijan's offensive operations against the Armenian-populated enclave of Nagorno-Karabakh. He also co-sponsored H. Res. 1165, which condemned Azerbaijan's military operations in Nagorno-Karabakh, and denounced Turkish interference in the conflict. As a part of the House-passed FY2021 Appropriations bill, Krishnamoorthi co-authored an amendment to add millions of dollars in funding for de-mining in the Nagorno Karabakh region.

Other congressional investigations and oversight activities 
In November 2020, Krishnamoorthi led investigations into the National Highway Traffic Safety Administration (NHTSA)'s failure to establish side-impact test standards for children's car seats and boosters, effectively allowing manufacturers to create their own standards. Some manufacturers were found to be selling booster seats that had been shown to be unsafe in the companies' own safety tests. Krishnamoorthi successfully advocated for a provision in the FY2021 omnibus spending bill, which was signed into law on December 27, 2020, requiring the NHTSA to issue federal regulations for side-impact crash tests for booster seats.

In September 2020, Krishnamoorthi opened an investigation into the sale and lease of government vehicles with active safety recalls by the General Services Administration (GSA), publicly calling on the GSA to cease the sale and lease of such vehicles. This followed the passage of a House appropriations bill that included an amendment Krishnamoorthi and Representative Jan Schakowsky introduced prohibiting the GSA from selling recalled cars at auction.

In November 2020, Krishnamoorthi called for the investigation of Senator David Perdue's stock trades involving a defense contractor while he was on the Senate Armed Services Committee. In May 2020, Krishnamoorthi had called for members of Congress to be banned from trading individual stocks in response to allegations of insider trading against Senator Richard Burr and others.

During an Oversight Committee hearing into the Sackler family and Purdue Pharma's role in the opioid epidemic, Krishnamoorthi sharply criticized members of the Sackler family as well as Purdue Pharma executives, calling on Purdue Pharma president Craig Landau to take responsibility for the company's involvement in the opioid crisis and forgo the $3.5 million bonus he was then seeking from Purdue Pharma, while the company was struggling to pay out damages to victims of the opioid OxyContin.

In 2021, Krishnamoorthi began an investigation into the Washington Commanders and their owner, Dan Snyder, for workplace misconduct related to widespread sexual harassment, citing a lack of transparency in the NFL's own investigation into the matter. In April 2022, the Subcommittee on Economic and Consumer Policy found evidence indicating the team "routinely withheld security deposits that should have been returned to customers", "improperly convert[ed] certain unclaimed security deposits into revenue", and "repeatedly concealed ticket sales revenue" from the NFL. The Commanders denied any financial misconduct. In May 2022, Krishnamoorthi canceled a fundraiser "out of an abundance of caution" after being informed lobbyists had sent unauthorized correspondence and outreach for the event, referencing the ongoing investigation. Lobbyist Mike Manatos admitted the correspondence was sent without the knowledge of or coordination with Krishnamoorthi or his staff. In July 2022, Snyder testified before the House Committee in a private deposition. As of November 2022, the investigation was ongoing.

Committee assignments

Permanent Select Committee on Intelligence
Central Intelligence Agency Subcommittee
Committee on Oversight and Accountability
Subcommittee on Economic Growth, Energy Policy and Regulatory Affairs
Subcommittee on Health Care and Financial Services
Select Committee on Strategic Competition between the United States and the Chinese Communist Party

Source:

Caucus memberships

New Democrat Coalition
Congressional Asian Pacific American Caucus (Co-chair of the CAPAC Immigration Task Force)
Congressional Solar Caucus (co-founder)
Congressional Caucus to End the Youth Vaping Epidemic (co-founder)
Middle Class Jobs Caucus (co-founder)
LGBT Equality Caucus (Vice-chair)
COVID-19 Global Vaccination Caucus (Co-founder & Co-chair)
Manufacturing Caucus
Congressional Cooperative Business Caucus
Municipal Bond Caucus
Tech Accountability Caucus
Congressional Travel and Tourism Caucus
Congressional Fire Services Caucus
Congressional Career and Technical Education Caucus
Congressional Arts Caucus
Community College Caucus
Congressional Citizen Legislature Caucus
General Aviation Caucus
Quiet Skies Caucus
Candy Caucus
Small Brewers Caucus
Dietary Supplement Caucus
Pro-Choice
Black Maternal Health Caucus
Task Force to Combat Heroin Epidemic
Diabetes Caucus
Rare Disease Caucus
Childhood Cancer Caucus
Lyme Disease Caucus
Autism Caucus
Congressional Animal Protection Caucus
Sri Lanka Caucus

Electoral history

Personal life
Krishnamoorthi's wife Priya is a doctor. They live in Schaumburg, Illinois, with their three children.

In January 2017, Krishnamoorthi, a lifelong Chicago Cubs fan, and his elder son attended the Cubs' official White House commemoration of their World Series victory.

See also
List of Asian Americans and Pacific Islands Americans in the United States Congress

References

External links

Congressman Raja official U.S. House website
Campaign website

 

|-

1973 births
21st-century American politicians
American Hindus
American Tamil politicians
Democratic Party members of the United States House of Representatives from Illinois
Harvard Law School alumni
Indian emigrants to the United States
People associated with Kirkland & Ellis
Living people
Members of the United States Congress of Indian descent
Asian-American members of the United States House of Representatives
People from New Delhi
People from Peoria, Illinois
People from Schaumburg, Illinois
People with acquired American citizenship
Princeton University alumni
American politicians of Indian descent
Asian-American people in Illinois politics